The 1994 World Rally Championship was the 22nd season of the FIA World Rally Championship. The season consisted of 10 rallies. The drivers' world championship was won by Didier Auriol in a Toyota Celica Turbo 4WD, ahead of Carlos Sainz and Juha Kankkunen. The manufacturers' title was won by Toyota, ahead of Subaru and Ford.

Calendar

In 1994 started a system of rotation on the World Rally Championship. Because of this, Sweden, Australia and Spain were dropped from the championship and instead were run as part of 1994 FIA 2-Litre World Rally Cup. This reduced number of full WRC events to ten, the lowest number since 1974–76.

Teams and drivers

Standing

Drivers' Championship

For the Drivers' Championship, points were awarded to the top 10 finishers.

Manufacturers' Championship

Points were awarded to the top 10 finishers, but only the best placed car of each registered manufacturer obtained points.

Results

External links 

 FIA World Rally Championship 1994 at ewrc-results.com

World Rally Championship
World Rally Championship seasons